Sipat Super Thermal Power Station is located at Sipat in Bilaspur district in state of Chhattisgarh. The power plant is one of the coal based power plants of NTPC. The coal for the power plant is sourced from Dipika Mines of South Eastern Coalfields Limited.

The project has an installed capacity of 2980 MW consisting of two stages, stage one which got commissioned late was of 3 units of 660 MW each involving super-critical boilers technology and stage two consisted of 2 units of 500 MW each. PM Manmohan Singh inaugurated the Sipat Thermal Power Plant on September 20, 2013.

Transport
Sipat Super Thermal Power Station is located off the Tatanagar–Bilaspur section of Howrah–Nagpur–Mumbai line.

External links
 

Coal-fired power stations in Chhattisgarh
Bilaspur district, Chhattisgarh
2011 establishments in Chhattisgarh
Energy infrastructure completed in 2011